Richard Irving Edell (1944 – May 2, 2018) was an American lacrosse coach. He served as the head coach for the University of Maryland, United States Military Academy, and University of Baltimore's men's lacrosse teams. Edell was inducted into the US Lacrosse Hall of Fame in 2004, at which time he held the second-most NCAA tournament appearances of any head coach.

Early life
Born in Maryland in 1944, Edell attended Towson University, where he played lacrosse and was named an honorable mention All-American as a midfielder in 1967. He graduated in 1967 with a degree in physical education. Edell continued his education, earning a master's degree in education from Western Maryland (now McDaniel College) in 1970 and, later while coaching, a master's degree in science from the University of Baltimore in 1976.

Coaching career
Edell's first coaching position was as the freshman team coach at his alma mater, Towson, where he served for two years. He then held the head coaching position at Calvert Hall High School for three years, and led his team to the 1971 and 1972 Maryland Scholastic Association (MSA) championships. The University of Baltimore provided him his first collegiate head coaching opportunity, and, in four years, he led the team to three NCAA Division II tournaments. During that time, he also coached UB's soccer team, which he led to the 1975 NCAA Division II national championship. In 1977, Edell took over as the Army head coach. During his seven-year tenure, he compiled a 66–24 record and led the Cadets to four NCAA tournament appearances. He also coached Army Black Knights men's soccer from 1979–1981.

Edell took over as the Maryland head coach starting with the 1984 season. During his 18-year tenure there, he led the Terrapins to three Atlantic Coast Conference (ACC) titles and 13 NCAA tournament appearances, which included three appearances in the championship game. In his second year with the Terrapins, he led the team to a 2–1 conference record to secure the championship. The following season, Maryland finished with a 10–3 overall record and advanced to the NCAA quarterfinals before elimination. In 1987, Edell led Maryland to a perfect 3–0 mark for the conference title and led the team to the NCAA semifinals. From 1991 to 1998, the Terrapins secured an NCAA tournament berth each season. In 1995, 1997, and 1998, Maryland advanced to the tournament final before being eliminated. In 1998, the Terps again finished with a perfect conference mark, 3–0. In 2001, he retired from coaching due to a non-life-threatening health issue, inclusion body myositis. The 57-year-old Edell said, "My mind and heart want to do this, but my body won't."

In 2011, first-year Maryland head coach John Tillman led Maryland to the national championship game, and he contacted Edell for advice. Edell, whose teams lost their three championship game appearances, told The Washington Times"I said 'John, I tried practicing on Sunday. I tried not practicing on Sunday. I can't give you any help for Monday' ... We thought long and hard after the first one [a 13–9 loss to Syracuse]. I don't know if we made mistakes. I don't have the answer. Whatever he does on Monday, he's on his own.I will counsel people on the semifinals. I don't have a useful thing to say about the final."

Records and honors
At the time of his retirement, Edell, with 282 wins, was the fifth-winningest all-time head coach in terms of wins, and the sixth-winningest active head coach in terms of winning percentage. He was also the second-winningest active head coach by wins, behind Jack Emmer of Army with 289, and the winningest all-time ACC coach, with 171 wins, ahead of Jim Adams of Virginia with 137. Edell had the second-most NCAA Division I tournament appearances, with 17, behind Roy Simmons, Jr. of Syracuse who had 18. He was the seventh head coach to reach the 400-game benchmark and the first ACC head coach to reach the 150-win benchmark.

The United States Intercollegiate Lacrosse Association (USILA) twice named Edell the National Coach of the Year: in 1978 with Army and in 1995 with Maryland. The Atlantic Coast Conference named him the ACC Coach of the Year three times: in 1989, 1992, and 1998. In 2004, Edell was inducted into the US Lacrosse Hall of Fame. He was also inducted into the US Lacrosse Potomac Chapter Hall of Fame, the US Lacrosse Greater Baltimore Chapter Hall of Fame, the University of Maryland Athletic Hall of Fame, the University of Baltimore Athletic Hall of Fame, the Towson University Hall of Fame  and the Army West Point Athletic Hall of Fame.

Personal life
Edell and his wife, Dolores, had four children. Two of his daughters graduated from the University of Maryland, while their son graduated from Dartmouth College after a successful college lacrosse career. Their youngest daughter attended the University of Delaware, where she also played lacrosse. He died at a hospital in Columbia, Maryland from pneumonia on May 2, 2018 at the age of 74.

References

1944 births
2018 deaths
American lacrosse players
American soccer coaches
Army Black Knights men's lacrosse coaches
Army Black Knights men's soccer coaches
Baltimore Bees men's lacrosse coaches
Baltimore Bees men's soccer coaches
Deaths from pneumonia in Maryland
Maryland Terrapins men's lacrosse coaches
Towson Tigers men's lacrosse coaches
Towson Tigers men's lacrosse players
Western Maryland College alumni